Ernest Geoffrey Parsons CVO CBE (13 May 1901 – 26 August 1991) was a British estate manager who became one of the Commissioners of the Crown Estates for Queen Elizabeth II. He was made a Commander of the Order of the British Empire (CBE), and a Commander of the Royal Victorian Order (CVO) for his services. 

Parsons was born in Bristol as the eldest son of Ernest Parsons, a paint manufacturer (Black Friar Paints), and Ellen Mary Hill. His younger brother Dick Parsons was a championship rifle marksman with the British Army, and his cousin Patrick Seager Hill was a clothing manufacturer, and a pioneer and developer of fire protective clothing.  He was educated at Clifton College, then later at Cambridge University, where he studied estate management, and became a farmer in the Salisbury, Wiltshire area.

In the 1950s he became the liaison officer for the South Western Division of the Ministry of Agriculture, and for this he was made a Commander of the Order of the British Empire (CBE) in the 1963 Birthday Honours. He was then appointed a Commissioner of the Crown Estates by Queen Elizabeth II, for which he was made a Commander of the Royal Victorian Order (CVO) in the 1973 Birthday Honours. He died on 26 August 1991 in Salisbury, Wiltshire, and is interred at Great Wishford Church, Wiltshire.

References 

1901 births
1991 deaths
Commanders of the Royal Victorian Order
Commanders of the Order of the British Empire
Civil servants from Bristol